The 11th season of Law & Order premiered on NBC October 18, 2000, and concluded with a two-hour finale on May 23, 2001. This was the first season of the series to start in October.

Cast
Nora Lewin (played by Dianne Wiest) replaced season 10's Adam Schiff (Steven Hill) as District Attorney. He was the last remaining member of the show's original cast at the end of the 10th season.  Angie Harmon, who played Abbie Carmichael, left the series at the end of the 11th season.

Main cast
 Jerry Orbach as Senior Detective Lennie Briscoe
 Jesse L. Martin as Junior Detective Ed Green
 S. Epatha Merkerson as Lieutenant Anita Van Buren
 Sam Waterston as Executive Assistant District Attorney Jack McCoy
 Angie Harmon as Assistant District Attorney Abbie Carmichael
 Dianne Wiest as Interim District Attorney Nora Lewin

Recurring cast
 Carey Lowell as Defense Attorney Jamie Ross

Episodes

Notes

The original airing of episode "Thin Ice" was delayed a week due to Vice President Al Gore's concession speech in the extended 2000 Presidential election.
The episode "Sunday In the Park with Jorge" was based on incidents of violence at the 2000 Puerto Rican Day Parade, and caused a controversy by offending some members of the Puerto Rican community.  NBC promised not to re-run it.  Despite NBC's embargo, the episode is still rerun in syndication.

References

External links
Episode guide from NBC.com

11
2000 American television seasons
2001 American television seasons